An 18 wheeler or semi-trailer truck is the combination of a tractor unit and one or more semi-trailers to carry freight.

18 Wheeler may also refer to:
 18 Wheeler (band), a Scottish indie band
 18 Wheeler: American Pro Trucker, a 2000 video game
 "18 Wheeler", a song by Pink from Missundaztood
 Boeing 747, as its landing gear has 18 wheels
 "Roll On (Eighteen Wheeler)", a 1984 song by country band Alabama